The 29th Venice Biennale, held in 1958, was an exhibition of international contemporary art, with 36 participating nations. The Venice Biennale takes place biennially in Venice, Italy. Winners of the Gran Premi (Grand Prize) included American painter Mark Tobey, Spanish sculptor Eduardo Chillida, Brazilian etcher Fayga Ostrower, Italians painter Osvaldo Licini, sculptor Umberto Mastroianni, and etcher Luigi Spacal.

References

Bibliography

Further reading 

 
 
 
 
 
 
 
 
 
 
 

1958 in art
1958 in Italy
Venice Biennale exhibitions